"Aiming At Your Heart" is an uptemo R&B song recorded by the American R&B group The Temptations, produced by Thom Bell, arranged by Bill Neale, written by Joseph Jefferson, Charles Simmons, and Richard Roebuck.

Details 
"Aiming At Your Heart" was released as the lead single from the group's 1981 self-titled album, The Temptations.

Chart performance 
The single peaked at No. 67 on the Billboard Hot 100. It was more successful on the Hot Soul Singles chart, reaching No. 36.

Track listing

Personnel

Musicians 

 The Temptations (Otis Williams, Melvin Franklin, Dennis Edwards, Richard Street, Glenn Leonard) – vocals
 Thom Bell – keyboards
 Bobby Eli, Bill Neale – guitars
 Bob Babbitt – bass
 Charles E. Collins – drums
 Larry B. Washington, Edward W. Shea – percussion
 Don Renaldo and His Strings and Horns – strings and horns

Production 

 Bill Neale – arrangements, conductor
 Dirk Dalvin – chief engineer
 Bruce Bluestein, Rob Perkins, Rick Fisher – assistant engineer
 Tammara Bell – production coordinator
 Johnny Lee – art direction
 Terry Taylor – design
 Francesco Alexander – photography

References 

1981 singles
 The Temptations songs
1981 songs
Rhythm and blues songs
Motown singles
Gordy Records singles